Emiliano Strappini Allen (born 4 September 1986) is an Argentinian former footballer.

Club career
Born and raised in Armstrong, Santa Fe Province, Strappini started his career at Chacarita Juniors' youth set-up aged 14. In 2006, he went on trial to Atlético Madrid reserve side, but he failed to join Spanish team after didn't reaching an agreement with the club.

In January 2007, Strappini joined to Chilean club Lota Schwager, freshly promoted to the top division. He debuted with Ñublense and his first goal came on May 15 in a 2–1 loss with powerhouse Universidad de Chile, scoring the game's first goal. Then, on May 27, he scored his side's two goals in a 2–2 draw with Deportes La Serena. He left Lota after the team's relegation and ended the entire season with 5 goals in 34 appearances.

In January 2008, Strappini returned to Chacarita after being heavy linked with a move to Ecuadorian powerhouse Emelec.

Honours

Club
Chacarita Juniors
 Primera B Nacional: 2008–09

References

External links

1986 births
Living people
People from Belgrano Department, Santa Fe
Argentine people of Italian descent
Argentine footballers
Argentine expatriate footballers
Expatriate footballers in Chile
Lota Schwager footballers
Association football forwards
Sportspeople from Santa Fe Province